Nidd is a small village and civil parish in the Harrogate district of North Yorkshire, England. The population of the village taken at the 2011 census was 168. The village used to have a railway station (Nidd Bridge) on the Leeds to Northallerton Railway, but this was closed down on 18 June 1962.

The village takes its name from the River Nidd which passes through the parish. The parish church of St Paul & St Margaret has a stone monument to the Rawson family who owned Nidd Hall in the 19th and the early part of the 20th centuries. Nidd Hall is a former country house which has been converted into a hotel.

Until 1889, Nidd was part of the Liberty of Ripon.

References

Villages in North Yorkshire
Civil parishes in North Yorkshire